George Chinnery was an Anglican bishop  in Ireland during the second half of the 18th century.

Chinnery was educated at Trinity College, Dublin.  He was Dean of Cork from 1763 until 1779. On  21 December 1778 he was nominated to be Bishop of Killaloe and Kilfenora; and was consecrated on 7 March 1779. He was translated to Cloyne on  15 February 1780. He died in August later that year.

References

Alumni of Trinity College Dublin
Deans of Cork
Bishops of Clonfert and Kilmacduagh
Bishops of Killaloe and Kilfenora
Bishops of Cloyne
1780 deaths
Year of birth missing
18th-century Anglican bishops in Ireland